Raja Feather Kelly is an American dancer and choreographer based in Brooklyn who is notable for his "radical downtown surrealist" productions which combine "pop and queer culture". He has choreographed numerous theatrical productions, including Fairview and A Strange Loop. He is the artistic director of his dance company called The Feath3r Theory, and he serves as the artistic director of the New Brooklyn Theatre.

Early life

Kelly grew up in Fort Hood, Texas and later in Long Branch, New Jersey, where he graduated from Long Branch High School and was selected to participate in the theater program of the Governor's School of the Arts. He attended Connecticut College where he studied English and poetry and dance, graduating in 2009.

Career
Reviewer Sara Aridi in The New York Times wrote that "one leaves a performance of Raja's infected by his curiosity, love of craft and just plain outrageousness." His choreography was described in Vogue magazine as combining social dance with the black vernacular. Critic Brian Schaefer in The New York Times wrote that Kelly's choreography has a "lighter touch, a flirty wink and a queer sensibility" that "treats pop culture as a kind of religion itself." A prime influence of Kelly in his approach to dance was the American visual and pop artist Andy Warhol. Kelly has raised money for dance production by hosting telethons out of his apartment.

In 2020, Kelly directed and choreographed by an Off-Broadway production of We're Gonna Die by Young Jean Lee. It opened in Second Stage Theater's Tony Kiser Theater on February 4 and was scheduled to run through March 22.

References

Further reading

External links
 Profile in Dance magazine

Year of birth missing (living people)
Living people
African-American choreographers
American choreographers
Entertainers from New Jersey
Long Branch High School alumni
People from Fort Hood, Texas
People from Long Branch, New Jersey
People from Brooklyn
Contemporary dance choreographers
Connecticut College alumni
American gay artists
21st-century African-American people